The Joseph Horton House is an historic structure located in New Hackensack, New York. Once part of a larger  farm, the farmhouse was built between 1725 and 1752. In 1840, the farm was divided, leaving the house on a  parcel, and it became known as "Old Hundred". Only a  lot remains intact. It was listed on the National Register of Historic Places on November 2, 1988. The building is located on the north side of NY 376, or New Hackensack Road.

The house is privately owned, but has been restored and is open for tours by appointment.

References

External links
Historic Joseph Horton House

Houses on the National Register of Historic Places in New York (state)
Houses completed in 1752
National Register of Historic Places in Dutchess County, New York
Historic house museums in New York (state)
Museums in Dutchess County, New York
Houses in Dutchess County, New York